'Love Will Find a Way' is a single from the British rock band, Delirious?, and is taken from their 2008 album, Kingdom of Comfort. The single was announced  at the start of the band's Kingdom of Comfort UK tour, which began in October 2008. It was sold as three discs: two CDs containing different versions of the song, and a DVD which features the music video. It is also available from digital music retailer iTunes Store. It was released on 17 November 2008. It reached No. 55 in the UK charts in its first week.

Track listings 

CD1

 "Love Will Find a Way" (radio version)
 "Mothers of the Night"

CD2

 "Love Will Find a Way" (album version)
 "Love Will Find a Way" (acoustic version)
 "Love Will Find a Way" (remix)

DVD

 "Love Will Find a Way" (video)
 "Kingdom of Comfort Electronic Press Kit"

Chart performance

References 

Delirious? songs
2008 songs
Songs written by Martin Smith (English musician)
Songs written by Stu G